Nesconset is a hamlet and census-designated place (CDP) in the town of Smithtown, located in Suffolk County, Long Island, New York, United States. The population was 13,387 at the 2010 census.

Geography
Nesconset is located at  (40.846090, -73.150573).

Demographics of the CDP
As of the census of 2000, there were 11,992 people, 3,964 households, and 3,226 families residing in the CDP. The population density was 3,133.5 per square mile (1,208.9/km2). There were 4,227 housing units at an average density of 1,104.5/sq mi (426.1/km2). The racial makeup of the CDP was 94.37% White, 0.96% African American, 0.11% Native American, 3.11% Asian, 0.07% Pacific Islander, 0.57% from other races, and 0.82% from two or more races. Hispanic or Latino of any race were 3.36% of the population.

There were 3,964 households, out of which 39.7% had children under the age of 18 living with them, 71.5% were married couples living together, 7.1% had a female householder with no husband present, and 18.6% were non-families. 14.7% of all households were made up of individuals, and 4.0% had someone living alone who was 65 years of age or older. The average household size was 4.97 and the average family size was 4.31.

In the CDP, the population was spread out, with 25.7% under the age of 18, 6.5% from 18 to 24, 32.3% from 25 to 44, 25.8% from 45 to 64, and 9.6% who were 65 years of age or older. The median age was 37 years. For every 100 females, there were 96.0 males. For every 100 females age 18 and over, there were 93.5 males.

The median income for a household in the CDP was $100,350, and the median income for a family was $96,127. Males had a median income of $102,883 versus $96,556 for females. The per capita income for the CDP was $30,794. About 1.6% of families and 2.3% of the population were below the poverty line, including 3.2% of those under age 18 and none of those age 65 or over.

Nesconset was expanded in the early 1970s to include a portion of what was Lake Ronkonkoma, New York. The area includes land from Gibbs Pond Road east to School House Road and from Brown's Road south to Smithtown Boulevard. Nesconset lies within both the Sachem and Smithtown school districts.

History 
Prior to contemporary settlement, a sparse population of farmers were lived near Lake Ronkonkoma. A primitive road network existed as Gibbs Pond Road, Browns Road, Old Nichols Road, Townline Road and the predecessor of Smithtown Boulevard. In 1904, brothers and French immigrants Louis and Clemen Vion came to the Pine Barrens of southeastern Smithtown from Manhattan on numerous occasions as sportsmen. By 1910, the brothers fell a line of trees off of Gibbs Pond Road immediately south of modern-day NY-347 to create Midwood Avenue. They built their home on this street where it still present.

As the population grew, a lumber yard, general store, and post office were constructed in 1908. The historic Nesconset Schoolhouse was built in 1910 and the Nesconset Fire Department was built by 1935, A commercial center emerged where Lake Avenue South and Gibbs Pond Road meet. The brothers decided to name the newly established settlement after Smithtown's local historical figure, Nasseconsett, who deeded the Nissequogue people's land to Richard Smith. Later development was concentrated on Lake Avenue South, Southern Boulevard and the Lake Ronkonkoma area along Gibbs Pond Road in the form of summer residences.

By 1930, Nesconset had a population of 50 people along Lake Avenue and spread along Smithtown Boulevard and Gibbs Pond Road. The construction of NY-347 in the 1950s opened the southeast corner of Smithtown to rapid residential development to Storybook Homes by bisecting the small center of the hamlet. This forced the shift of the commercial center of Nesconset to Smithtown Boulevard between Old Nichols Road and Southern Boulevard. This area was known formerly as East Hauppauge.

References 

Smithtown, New York
Census-designated places in New York (state)
Census-designated places in Suffolk County, New York